Annayum Rasoolum is a 2013 Indian Malayalam-language romantic drama film directed by Rajeev Ravi (in his directorial debut) and written by Santhosh Echikkanam from a story by Ravi. Set in Vypin islands in Kerala, the plot revolves around a star-crossed romance between Rasool (Fahadh Faasil), a Muslim taxi driver, and Anna (Andrea Jeremiah), a Latin Christian salesgirl, both from conservative working class families. The songs and background score were composed by K.

Annayum Rasoolum was released on 4 January 2013, the film received positive critical response and was also a commercial success at the box office. The film won a National Film Award and three Kerala State Film Awards.

Plot

The story is told through the narration of Ashley who is working in merchant navy and is signing off in Kochi for the second time. Ashley recollects the events happened in his last sign off at Kochi. Rasool is a tourist taxi driver from Mattancherry, Kochi. He falls in love with Anna, a Latin Christian girl who works as salesgirl in a popular apparel shop. It takes time for Rasool to convince Anna and make her understand his love for her; he always follows her as she travels regularly to her work place.

One day Ashley has to pick his relative from the textile shop. Using Rasool he plans to pick them up in his taxi and there he finds out that Anna is also going to return home in the same taxi. They make a quick pit stop at a church where Anna leaves her bag in the taxi. Rasool peeks inside and gets her number from the phone. Rasool is nervous and shy at first but his friends persuade him to text her through phone. No replies comes at first. Then one day, Rasool approaches Anna and tells her that he loves her. Anna is surprised and stunned and moves away without an answer.

The following day Rasool is sick and stays home. Anna boards the boat like every other day but is anxious since Rasool was not around anywhere she went that day. Anna seems restless as she cannot stop thinking about Rasool and why he had not come to see her. She can not wait longer and she desperately texts Rasool on the phone. Rasool on receiving the message rushes to see Anna. Anna further tells him that she is scared and tells him it will not work out. Rasool then explains that he loves her no matter what and religion does not affect his affection towards her. Then Anna calls him one day to go to a convent where a nun tries to persuade Rasool to change his religion for marriage which Rasool declines.

In the later part of the film, we find that this nun is Anna's elder sister who had gone to convent after a love failure. Ashley, who had a soft corner for her, does not reveal it to her even after finding out about her love failure. The rest of the part narrates incidents happening around Anna and Rasool, their love for each other and those who are close to them. In the climax, after some events which blocked their relationship, Anna commits suicide, and this takes a toll on Rasool.

The next year Ashley comes back again for another leave and says that he has got back his girl, who is none other than Anna's elder sister to whom he finally reveals his love. She joins him leaving the convent life. He tries to find Rasool, but is not successful. A few scenes are added where the now lone Rasool travels in a local train, suggesting that he left Vypin for good and moved to Mumbai.

Cast 

 Fahadh Faasil as Rasool, a Muslim tourist taxi driver in Fort Kochi
 Andrea Jeremiah as Anna, a Latin Christian salesgirl who works in a textile shop (Voice by Shakthisree Gopalan)
 Sunny Wayne as Ashley, the narrator of the film who works in a merchant navy
 Soubin Shahir as Collin
 Ranjith as Usman
 Shine Tom Chacko as Abu
 Sija Rose as Lily
 Srinda Arhaan as Fazila
 Joy Mathew as Joseph, Anna's father
 Shane Nigam as Kunjumon, Anna's brother
 Aashiq Abu as Hyder
 P. Balachandran as Rasheed
 Jins Baskar as Jismon
 Muthumani as Shalu
 Alencier Ley Lopez as Constable Alencier
 Rajesh Sharma as Panchi
 KPAC Batrice as Kathrina
 Pauly Valsan
 M. G. Sasi

Production
Annayum Rasoolum marks the directorial debut of cinematographer Rajeev Ravi. It was produced by D Cutz Film Company, the screenplay was written by Santhosh Echikkanam. Ahaana Krishna was first offered the role of Anna, who was then a school student, she turned down the offer. Later, Andrea Jeremiah was cast in the role, making her debut in Malayalam cinema. According to Jeremiah, she was the last person to join the film and acted without any makeup.

Annayum Rasoolum began filming in Kochi, Kerala on 2 August 2012. The film was shot in Fort Kochi and Vypin Island. No media was allowed on the filming locations. Cinematographer was Madhu Neelakantan.

Soundtrack

The soundtrack was composed by K, who made his debut in Malayalam Cinema. It features remix versions of two songs by Mehboob. The song "Kandu Randu Kannu" was written by P. A. Kasim and set to music by M. S. Baburaj for the 1973 film Chuzhi while the song "Kaayalinarike" was written by Meppalli Balan. Anwar Ali wrote three songs: "Kando Kando", "Yaname" and "Vazhivakkil". Rafeeq Thiruvallur has written "Zammilooni", which is in Arabi-Malayalam dialect.

The audio was released on 12 December 2012. For the audio release held in Fort Kochi that forms the backdrop of his film, Rajeev Ravi organised a mehfil of Mehboob songs.

Reception

Box office 
The film, made at a production cost of 4.5 crore (45 million) did a business of 12 crore (120 million) at the box office, making it one of the financially benefited Malayalam films of the year. According to IBN Live, Annayum Rasoolum was the first commercial success in Malayalam in 2013.

Critical reaction 
In Rediff.com, Paresh C. Palicha rated three out of five and said: Annayum Rasoolum "is a tale told in the classical love story mould with the underbelly of Kochi city as its backdrop. The low lifers of this bulging cosmopolitan urban jungle populate this film" and that  "director is more interested in giving us a glimpse of the life led by those in the lower strata of society and we do not complain because whatever he shows is interesting". He concluded "Annayum Rasoolum is a chain of interesting moments woven into the thread of a love story". Palicha also gave thumps-up to the work of Ravi, acting of Abu and Chacko.

S. R. Praveen of The Hindu commented: "Annayum Rasoolum is a tale that moves leisurely. It speaks of love beyond the cosmetic (unlike Thattathin Marayathu), where the eyes speak rather than dupatta flutter". Praveen praised the performance of Faasil and the supporting cast that includes "even those who appear [only] in a handful of scenes" and the cinematography and direction. The Times of India awarded three out of five stars and appreciated Ravi detailed presentation in setting the backdrop of the story, but criticized the running time and characters' minimal speech.

Smitha of Filmibeat described the film as "realistic, refreshingly heart warming and a simple love story narrated in the most fantastic manner", and stated: "the story as such is not a novel plot, but it is the narration and the treatment which needs a standing ovation. Regular day-to-day events and happenings are encapsuled in a beautiful way making the entire experience very enjoyable and memorable. She praised the direction, cinematography, music, and the performances of every cast but criticized the film's running time.

The New Indian Express Anil R. Nair called it a "refreshingly heartwarming simple romantic tale". According to him, the "perfect casting and synchronized sound recording make the movie more realistic" and lauded the performance of Faasil. Nair said: "the story is not new, but the narration deserves a standing ovation" for that he praised Echikanam "brilliant screenplay" and Neelakhandan "excellent shots", and also the songs"Kandu Randu Kannu" and "Kaayalinarike". However he suggested a tight editing could have been "made the movie more appealing".

Accolades 
Annayum Rasoolum was screened at the section "Malayalam Cinema Today" at the International Film Festival of Kerala (IFFK). For the film, Radhakrishnan S. received a National Film Award for Best Audiography, and three Kerala State Film Awards for Madhu Neelakandan, B. Ajithkumar, and Jayadev Thiruveiyapati respectively for the film's cinematography, editing, and colour grading.

References

External links
 

2013 films
2010s Malayalam-language films
2013 romantic drama films
Indian romantic drama films
Films shot in Kochi
Indian interfaith romance films
Films scored by K (composer)
Films that won the Best Audiography National Film Award